Igor Almeida Figueiredo (born October 11, 1977) is a Brazilian former professional snooker player.

Career

Amateur career
Prior to entering the PIOS tour in 2009, Figueiredo had only played on 10-foot tables in his home country. Despite this, his results were impressive, allowing him to finish 12th on the year-end ranking list. Figueiredo's most significant achievement however came at the 2009 IBSF World Championship, as he enjoyed a spectacular run to the final. Although he lost 10–8 to experienced Alfie Burden, he was given a wild card by WPBSA onto the main tour for 2010/2011.

2010–2012
In his first professional tournament, the minor-ranking PTC Event 1, Figueiredo won two matches to reach the last 32. He went further in the Event 3, losing a decider to Barry Hawkins in the last 16. At the Shanghai Masters, Figueiredo beat Jamie O'Neill 5–4 and David Gilbert 5–4 (despite being docked a frame for forgetting his cue). His run ended in the last 64 losing 5–1 to Fergal O'Brien. He also qualified for the televised stages of the World Open, losing 0–3 in the third round to Mark Williams. From this point however, Figueiredo started to struggle for form, losing all his opening matches at the major tournaments. Thanks to his strong performances at the PTC events he was able to retain his tour card for the 2011/12 season, despite finishing only 80th in the world rankings.

Due to the lack of sponsorship Figueiredo only entered qualifying for one ranking event of the next season, the 2012 World Championship, where he won three matches, before losing 7–10 to Joe Jogia. He also participated in the inaugural Brazil Masters and defeated world number 17 Jamie Cope in the first round 4–2, but then lost by the same scoreline to Graeme Dott in the quarter-finals.

2013–2017
In 2013, Figueiredo returned to Main Tour after receiving the nomination from the Americas region, but the lack of sponsorship again forced him to sit out the whole season until the 2014 World Championship. He repeated his last 64 run of 2012 as he beat Adam Duffy 10–4 in the first qualifying round, and followed it with 10–8 win against Gerard Greene, but suffered a heavy 10–1 defeat to Martin Gould in the penultimate round.
Figueiredo also took part in the snooker tournament at the 2013 World Games, where he lost 3–2 to Dechawat Poomjaeng in the bronze medal match.

Figueiredo finally managed to gain sponsorship before the 2014 UK Championship, and was able to enter all the remaining tournaments of the 2014/2015 season. At the UK Championship he defeated Fergal O'Brien 6–4 to reach the last 64, where he lost 6–4 to Anthony McGill. He repeated this result at the German Masters qualifying by beating Kurt Maflin 5–3, before Stuart Bingham defeated him 5–1. Figueiredo went on to lose his opening match at each of the next three ranking tournaments, but enjoyed another strong run at the World Championship qualifiers. He started with a 10–3 win against veteran Nigel Bond, and followed that with a dramatic 10–9 victory over Rod Lawler, in a match where Figueiredo led 8–2 and 9–5, to reach the final round, where he lost 10–4 to Robin Hull.

Figueiredo was able to stay on the tour, as he was issued an International Development Main Tour Card as the Brazilian National Champion. He again had to sit out most of the season up to the 2016 World Championship where he was defeated 10–2 by Matthew Selt in the first qualifying round.

In the latter part of the 2016/2017 season Figueiredo had his best finishes on the tour to date. At the Welsh Open he secured wins over Alfie Burden, Anthony McGill and Dominic Dale, before falling 4–1 to Stuart Carrington. He also reached the fourth round of the Gibraltar Open by eliminating Sydney Wilson, Fraser Patrick and Thor Chuan Leong and lost 4–2 to Nigel Bond. He was relegated from the tour at the end of the year though due to being ranked 111th in the world.

2022-23 
Figueiredo had moved back to Brazil in 2021 during the COVID-19 pandemic and had not competed on any events since. In the 2022-23 season, he chose not to renew his membership of the WPBSA and was removed from the world rankings during the 2022 European Masters.

Performance and rankings timeline

Career finals

Non-ranking finals: 1

Amateur finals: 3 (2 titles)

References

External links
Igor Figueiredo at worldsnooker.com
 
 Profile on Global Snooker
 Profile on IBSF

Brazilian snooker players
Living people
1977 births
Sportspeople from Rio de Janeiro (city)
Competitors at the 2013 World Games